The following lists events that happened during 1996 in Rwanda.

Incumbents 
 President: Pasteur Bizimungu 
 Prime Minister: Pierre-Célestin Rwigema

Events

References

 
1990s in Rwanda
Years of the 20th century in Rwanda
Rwanda
Rwanda